Five Star Jubilee is an American country music variety show carried by NBC-TV from March 17–September 22, 1961. The live program, a spin-off of ABC-TV's Jubilee USA, was the first network color television series to originate outside New York City or Hollywood.

From March 17 to May 5, the weekly show aired on Fridays from 8–8:30 p.m. Eastern Time, but moved to 8:30–9 p.m. from May 12 to September 22.  The series featured five rotating hosts: Snooky Lanson (first show March 17), Tex Ritter (March 24), Rex Allen (March 31), Jimmy Wakely (April 7) and Carl Smith (April 14). All five appeared on the May 12 show, which was the first in color.

Produced from the Landers Theatre in Springfield, Missouri, the program was similar to Jubilee USA and featured some of the same cast, including Bobby Lord, Cecil Brower, Speedy Haworth and Slim Wilson's Jubilee Band. Barbara Mandrell (who had toured with Red Foley and a Jubilee USA personal appearance unit) made her network debut on the program at age 12. The final program was hosted by Foley, who also appeared on the July 7 show. In April he had been acquitted of tax evasion charges, which were believed to have originally kept him out of consideration as a host. The sponsor was Massey Ferguson.

Performers

Roy Acuff and the Smoky Mountain Boys
Jeanne and Janie Black
Margie Bowes
Uncle Cyp and Aunt Sap Brasfield
Cecil Brower 
Martha Carson
June Carter
The Carter Family
Jimmy Dean
Jimmy Driftwood
Ralph Emery
Flatt and Scruggs
The Foggy River Boys
Red Foley
Sally Foley
The Four Fuller Brothers
Don Gibson
Johnny Gimble
Betty Ann Grove
Speedy Haworth
Betty Johnson
Grandpa Jones
Claude King
Pee Wee King
Linda Lee
Bobby Lord
Barbara Mandrell
Harold Morrison and Jimmy Gately
Hank Morton
Les Paul and Mary Ford
Minnie Pearl
Ray Price
The Queen City Jazz Band
Carmel Quinn
Margie Singleton
Redd Stewart
Cathie Taylor
June Valli
The Wagon Wheelers
Bun Wilson
Slim Wilson
Faron Young

Production

Five Star Jubilee debuted March 17, 1961 in black-and-white, but switched to color on May 12. The first two color programs (May 12 and 19) were videotaped beginning at 1:30 a.m. local time Friday (for playback that evening) after nearby KTTS-AM signed off at 1:00 a.m., because of unforeseen RF interference from its transmitter with the color TV picture.  Despite the hour, both shows had audiences at the theater. NBC resolved the problem for the May 26 program, which was the first live color show. The series was aired by 150 NBC affiliates, although not by WNBC-TV in New York.

The program was produced from the Landers Theatre with KYTV-TV's assistance using two new NBC color mobile units (built for World Series coverage) and three RCA TK-41 cameras. Because it was the first color TV series outside New York City or Hollywood, scenic designer Andy Miller  created the first color scenic stage sets for television outside those two cities after receiving brief training at NBC in New York. The director was Fred Rains (floor director for Jubilee USA) and the consulting producer was the Jubilee'''s Bryan Bisney. Scriptwriters were Don Richardson and Bob Tubert.

Notes

References

 .
Byrne, Bridget "Barbara Mandrell: Just a Mom at 'Heart'" (January 19, 2000), BPI Entertainment News Wire
Hocklander, Sony "Celebrating 100 Years" (August 10, 2008), Springfield News-Leader, "Life," p. 1C
"Interference Disrupts 5-Star Jubilee Plans" (May 12, 1961), Springfield Leader-Press"'Jubilee' Turning to Color TV" (April 30, 1961), Springfield Leader-PressTerry, Dickson "The Show that Put a Town on the Map" (August 6, 1961), TV Guide, p. 8
Weekly program listings (1961), TV Guide'', Vol. 9, March–September

NBC original programming
1961 American television series debuts
1961 American television series endings
1960s American variety television series
1960s American music television series
American country music
Country music television series
English-language television shows